Raven Ioor McDavid Jr. (October 16, 1911 – October 21, 1984) was an American linguist who specialized in dialectology. His works include The Structure of American English, Linguistic Atlas of the Middle and South Atlantic States, The Pronunciation of English in the Atlantic States (with Hans Kurath), and the 1963 single-volume edition of H. L. Mencken's The American Language.

McDavid was born in Greenville, South Carolina, and was an undergraduate at Furman University, from which he received his A.B. in 1931. He went on to graduate school at Duke University, from which he received his M.A. in 1933 and his Ph.D. in 1935. McDavid did further graduate work at the University of Michigan and Yale University.

McDavid, who was attached to the Army Language Section in New York City during World War II, went on to teach at The Citadel, Michigan State University, and Western Reserve University before taking up a position at the University of Chicago in 1957. He would remain at Chicago until he retired in 1977.

McDavid died of a heart attack in Chicago at the age of 73.

References

External links 

 Raven Ioor McDavid Papers at the Newberry Library
Guide to the Raven I. McDavid Papers 1951-1976 at the University of Chicago Special Collections Research Center

Linguists from the United States
1911 births
1984 deaths
University of Michigan alumni
The Citadel, The Military College of South Carolina faculty
Furman University alumni
Duke University alumni
Yale University alumni
University of Chicago faculty
20th-century linguists